Agrocybe praecox is a species of brown-spored mushroom which appears early in the year in woods, gardens and fields.  According to modern taxonomic analysis, it is just one of a cluster of closely similar species which are often referred to as the Agrocybe praecox complex. It is found in Europe, North Africa and North America.

Description
Agrocybe praecox belongs to a group of species which are difficult to distinguish consistently.  The following description combines several references.

Veil remnants are often visible around the rim.
Gills: Initially whitish, later dark brown.
Stem: Pale,  (occasionally up to around ), quite thick (to about 1 cm) with a fragile ring.  Often with mycelial cords at the base.
Odor and taste: Floury.  Taste may be bitter.
Spores: 8–10 x 5–7 μm, ellipsoid, dark brown (en masse).
Habitat: Gregarious in grass or on wood debris in woods, gardens, or other contexts.  Like other Agrocybes, it is a saprophyte.
Season: Often observed in spring, but can also occur in summer and autumn.

Taxonomy and related species
The mushroom was first described by Persoon in 1800 as Agaricus praecox.  In 1889 Fayod devised the new genus Agrocybe and made A. praecox the type species.

The Latin epithet praecox ('early') is related to the word "precocious" and refers to the fact that this species often appears early in the year.

A 1990 study by Timothy Flynn and O. K. Miller finds that A. praecox is one of four species which are indistinguishable using superficial characteristics but which can be separated through their habitat and location.  If this proposal is accepted, the cluster consists of A. molesta and three other species which do not yet have proper names, but which are referred to as "Flynn & Miller Species I–III".  The three provisional species correspond to the older names A. acericola, A. elatella, A. praecox, and A. sphaleromorpha combined; and their synonyms.  According to the traditional system, various detailed morphological characteristics can be used to choose between the species, but such is variation amongst individuals that it is difficult to achieve a consistent identification in this way.

The following table summarizes the names of species which are closely related to A. praecox.  Note that Index Fungorum has been used as a reference throughout.

General
It has a widespread distribution in North America, Europe, Asia and North Africa.  Also it has been reported from Mongolia, Siberia, Sri Lanka, South Korea, Japan, New Zealand, Argentina and Colombia.

The species is not flavorful but is sometimes considered edible. It may be bitter, and one French source says that because of this characteristic and its soft consistency, it is best left aside.  Another site says that it is edible but needs to be well cooked. Roger Phillips lists it as inedible.

Another similar species is A. smithii.

References

Strophariaceae
Fungi of Europe
Fungi of North America
Fungi of Africa
Fungi described in 1800
Taxa named by Christiaan Hendrik Persoon